Wa Airport  is an airport serving Wa, a city in the Upper West Region of Ghana which is also its capital. The airport is operated by Ghana Airports Company Limited. It is the fifth busiest commercial airport in Ghana with over 25,000 passengers passing through in 2022.

History

The land was acquired by the Government in the year 1958.

Airlines and destinations

The airport opened to scheduled commercial flight operations on 15 October 2019 with service by Africa World Airlines from Accra via Tamale using an Embraer 145 regional jet. Services were suspended in March 2020 due to the COVID-19 pandemic and remain suspended pending resolution of various safety challenges.

In December 2021, Passion Air announced 3 weekly services to Accra via Tamale. This service was subsequently increased to 5 weekly non-stop services using a Dash 8 aircraft.

Passenger

Statistics 
These data show number of passengers movements through the airport, according to the Ghana Civil Aviation Authority.

References

External links
 

Airports in Ghana
Wa, Ghana